Senecio howeanus is an annual, or short-lived perennial, herb in the daisy family, Asteraceae. The specific epithet refers to the type locality.

Description
The plant grows up to 40 cm in height. The leaves are alternate, 4 cm long, 1.2 cm wide. The flowers occur in cymose inflorescences; they have 8–10 yellow outer florets with 15–25 funnel-shaped disc florets. The fruit is brown and 2.2–2.5 mm long.

Distribution and habitat
The plant is endemic. to Australia’s subtropical Lord Howe Island in the Tasman Sea. It is common near the shoreline of the island, including its adjacent islets, with a scattered distribution at higher elevations.

References

Asterales of Australia
howeanus
Endemic flora of Lord Howe Island
Plants described in 1992